Frank Richard Maze (November 16, 1919 – January 10, 1971; also known as Francis R. Mazejko) was an American football player and coach. He served as the head football coach at Dickinson College from 1950 to 1951 and at Colby College from 1952 to 1955.

Background
Maze played college football as a guard and tackle at Syracuse University in 1941. He also wrestled at Syracuse. He graduated from Syracuse in 1942 with a B.S. in physical education and earned an M.S. in education from Syracuse in 1948. 

Maze was the line coach at Wesleyan University from 1946 to 1949. At Wesleyan, he also coached wrestling and was an assistant coach in track.

References

External links
 

1919 births
1971 deaths
American football guards
American football tackles
Colby Mules football coaches
Dickinson Red Devils football coaches
Syracuse Orange football players
Syracuse Orangemen wrestlers
Wesleyan Cardinals football coaches
College track and field coaches in the United States
College wrestling coaches in the United States
Players of American football from New York City